Luke Doerner is an Australian field hockey player.  He plays for the Tassie Tigers in the Australian Hockey League. He is a member of the Australia men's national field hockey team, and won a gold medal at the 2010 Commonwealth Games.  He is trying to secure a spot on the national team in order to represent Australia at the 2012 Summer Olympics. He represents the Uttar Pradesh Wizards in the Hockey India League.

Field hockey
Doerner plays for the Tassie Tigers in the Australian Hockey League. He signed with and played for the team in 2011, competing in the first found of the 2011 season.  Prior to 2011, he played for the Victorian team in the Australian Hockey League. Earlier, he played professional hockey in the Netherlands for HC Bloemendaal and Laren. In 2011, he played club hockey in Hobart.

Doerner gave teammate Matthew Swann a yellow headband that Swann wears at every match.

National team
Doerner is a member of the Australia men's national field hockey team. In 2006, he represented Australia at the Azlan Shah tournament in Malaysia. He competed in the 2007 Champions Trophy competition for Australia. In December 2007, he was a member of the Kookaburras squad that competed in the Dutch Series in Canberra. In January 2008, he was a member of the senior national team that competed at the Five Nations men's hockey tournament in South Africa. He won a bronze medal at the 2008 Summer Olympics. He scored a goal in the bronze medal game against the Netherlands in the country's 6–1 victory. He was a member of the 2009 Champions Trophy winning team, playing in the gold medal match against Germany that Australia won by a score of 5–3. New national team coach Ric Charlesworth named him a returning member, alongside fourteen total new players who had few than 10 national team caps to the squad before in April 2009 in a bid to ready the team for the 2010 Commonwealth Games.

In 2009, he represented the country on a tour of Europe. He competed in the third match of the tour against England where Australia won 5–4. He represented Australia at the 2010 Commonwealth Games. He was sent off with ten minutes left in the game against the Netherlands as a result of having earned two red cards. In the gold medal match against India that Australia won 8–0,  he scored two goals.  Overall, he was the competition's leading scorer with eight goals. In 2010, he won a gold medal at the World Cup.  In the 2–1 victory in the gold medal round against Germany, he scored a goal in the fifty-ninth minute. Because of other commitments, he could not compete at the Azlan Shah Cup in Malaysia in May 2011.   In December 2011, he was named as one of twenty-eight players to be on the 2012 Summer Olympics Australian men's national training squad.  This squad will be narrowed in June 2012.  He trained with the team from 18 January to mid-March in Perth, Western Australia.  In February during the training camp, he played in a four nations test series with the teams being the Kookaburras, Australia A Squad, the Netherlands and Argentina.   The competition was his first since returning from time away from the game as a result of injury.  He played for Australia A Squad.  In the series, his team beat Argentina 4-2 and he scored a goal in the match.

References

External links
 
 Luke Doerner official website

1979 births
Australian male field hockey players
Field hockey players from Melbourne
Living people
Olympic field hockey players of Australia
Olympic bronze medalists for Australia
2006 Men's Hockey World Cup players
2010 Men's Hockey World Cup players
Field hockey players at the 2008 Summer Olympics
Commonwealth Games gold medallists for Australia
Field hockey players at the 2006 Commonwealth Games
Field hockey players at the 2010 Commonwealth Games
Olympic medalists in field hockey
Date of birth missing (living people)
Medalists at the 2008 Summer Olympics
Commonwealth Games medallists in field hockey
HC Bloemendaal players
Expatriate field hockey players
Hockey India League players
20th-century Australian people
21st-century Australian people
Medallists at the 2006 Commonwealth Games
Medallists at the 2010 Commonwealth Games